Acryptolechia torophanes is a moth in the family Depressariidae. It was described by Edward Meyrick in 1935. It is found in China (Henan, Shaanxi, Zhejiang, Hubei) and Korea.

References

Moths described in 1935
Acryptolechia